The 1915 Giro di Lombardia was the eleventh edition of the Giro di Lombardia cycle race and was held on 7 November 1915, over a course of .

117 cyclists (of 164 signed up) departed from Milan and 55 completed the race.

General classification

References

1915
Giro di Lombardia
Giro di Lombardia